Michel et Augustin is a French brand of food created in 2004 by  Augustin Paluel-Marmont and Michel de Rovira, two ESCP-Europe alumni. Michel de Rovira attended HEC, Grenoble Ecole de Management and INSEAD Business School. Michel et Augustin is owned by the French food-product corporation Danone since 2016.

The brand started by producing flavored cookies (Petits sablés ronds et bons), and soon complemented its range with premium yogurt drinks (Vache à boire) and Lassi. In 2007, it started to commercialize yogurt ice-creams. By 2009, they had over 60 stock keeping units.

The marketing target is Parisian and French bobos and the products are sold in food stores and coffee shops. The communication of the brand is inspired by buddy brands such as Ben & Jerry's, Nantucket Nectars or Innocent Drinks, capitalizing on complicity with the customer.

Michel et Augustin opened a subsidiary in the USA in January 2015. The headquarters are based in Brooklyn, and they start selling their cookie squares nationwide, especially at Whole Foods, Delta Airlines and companies cafeterias such Facebook or Google offices.

References

External links
 
 New York Serious Eats

Dairy products companies of France